Mayo East or East Mayo may refer to one of two parliamentary constituencies in County Mayo, Ireland:

Mayo East (Dáil constituency) (1969–1997)
East Mayo (UK Parliament constituency) (1885–1922)

See also
County Mayo